A mausoleum is an external free-standing building constructed as a monument enclosing the interment space or burial chamber of a deceased person or people. A monument without the interment is a cenotaph. A mausoleum may be considered a type of tomb, or the tomb may be considered to be within the mausoleum.

List of Mausoleums in Iran 

 Aladdin Tower
 Mausoleum of Attar of Nishapur
 Avicenna Mausoleum
 Baba Tahir Mausoleum, Hamadan
 Baba Tahir Mausoleum, Khorramabad
 Besh Qardash
 Chehel Dokhtaran mausoleum
 Fakhrigah
 Tomb of Ferdowsi
 Grave of Pir Quzhd
 Gur-e-Dokhtar
 Khaje Taj od-Din mausoleum
 Kharraqan towers
 Mausoleum of Ruhollah Khomeini
 Mausoleum of Mir Bozorg
 Mausoleum of Shah Abbas I
 Mausoleum of Omar Khayyám
 On ibn Ali's shrine
 Pir Bakran mausoleum
 Qadamgah Hazrat Ali
 Reza Shah's mausoleum
 Sheikh Ahmad-e Jami mausoleum complex
 Sheikh Safi al-Din Khānegāh and Shrine Ensemble
 Shrine of Abu Lu'lu'a
 Tomb of Sheikh Yusof Sarvestani
 Tomb of Abu al-Hassan Kharaqani
 Tomb of Abu Usman Al-Maghribi
 Tomb of Artaxerxes I of Persia
 Tomb of Baba Loghman
 Tomb of Bibi Dokhtaran
 Tomb of Boghrat
 Tomb of Cyrus
 Tomb of Daniel
 Tomb of Darius II
 Tomb of Esther and Mordechai
 Tomb of Hadi Sabzevari
 Tomb of Hassan Modarres
 Tomb of Haydar Amuli
 Tomb of Heydar Yaghma
 Tomb of Kamal-ol-molk
 Tomb of Khajeh Rabie
 Tomb of Mir Zobeyr
 Tomb of Nader Shah
 Tomb of Pir Palandouz
 Tomb of Shah Firooz
 Tomb of Shah Qalandar
 Tomb of Seyed Alaeddin Husayn
 Tomb of Shaykh Haydar
 Tomb of Sheikh Shahab ol Din Ahari
 Tomb of Wais
 Tomb of Xerxes I
 Tomb of Ya'qub ibn al-Layth al-Saffar

Gallery

References 

Mausoleums